Gina DeVettori (born May 5 in California) is an American actress and writer.

Early years 
 
DeVettori was born on Cinco de Mayo and is a native Californian. She graduated from the University of Mobile with a Bachelor of Arts in theatre.

Work
DeVettori has appeared in the films 40 Days and 40 Nights, Party Animalz, High Hopes, Opie Gets Laid, The Shiftling, Gothic Vampires from Hell, and The Mexican Dream. She was also the voice of Ayane in the English-language edition of Dead or Alive 2: Hardcore.

References

External links
 
 
 

Actresses from California
American film actresses
American writers of Italian descent
Screenwriters from California
American voice actresses
20th-century American actresses
21st-century American actresses
University of Mobile alumni
Living people
Year of birth missing (living people)